CW 57 or CW57 could refer to the branding of the following American television stations affiliated with or owned by the Paramount Global and Warner Bros. Discovery:

WPSG located in Philadelphia, Pennsylvania.
KXTU-LD serving Colorado Springs, Pueblo, and other communities in southern Colorado
WIFS (TV) a CW virtual channel 57